The 2022 NCAA Division III women's basketball tournament was the tournament hosted by the NCAA to determine the national champion of Division III women's collegiate basketball in the United States for the 2021–22 NCAA Division III women's basketball season.

The championship rounds were played at the UPMC Cooper Fieldhouse in Pittsburgh, March 17–19, 2022. The final game had Hope beating Whitewater 71–58. 

This was the first tournament since 2019, as the two previous editions in 2020 and 2021 were both canceled due to the COVID-19 pandemic.

Qualifying

Automatic bids (44)

At-large bids (20)

Sectionals

Amherst Sectional

Whitewater Sectional

Holland Sectional

Lexington Sectional

Final Four

See also
 2022 NCAA Division I women's basketball tournament
 2022 NCAA Division II women's basketball tournament
 2022 NAIA women's basketball tournament
 2022 NCAA Division III men's basketball tournament

References

 
NCAA Division III women's basketball tournament
2022 in sports in Pennsylvania